CentralPlaza Khon Kaen is a shopping mall in Khon Kaen, Thailand. The mall opened on December 3, 2009. It is the first shopping mall of Central Group in Isan of Thailand. Thailand's second largest retail corporation in the northeastern region of Thailand, the largest department store in the northeastern region is The Mall Nakhon Ratchasima. Later Central Pattana acquired Charoensri Complex in Udon Thani, and renamed it CentralPlaza Udon Thani. The total cost of the shopping complex was 4 billion baht (€80 million).

Anchors 
 Central Department Store (4 December 2021-Present , Renovate from Robinson department store)
 Tops
 SF Cinema 8 Cinemas
 Escent Condominium Khonkaen
 Khon Kaen Hall
 B2S Think Space
 Officemate
 Power Buy
 Supersports
 Food Park

Previously anchor 
 Robinson department store (3 December 2009 - November 2021)

See also 
 List of shopping malls in Thailand

Notes

External links 
 CentralPlazaKhonKaen website

References 
 
 

Shopping malls in Thailand
Central Pattana
Shopping malls established in 2009
2009 establishments in Thailand